This is a list of footballers who have played international football for the Qatari national football team and that were born outside Qatari territory.

The following players:
have played at least one game for the full (senior male) Qatar international team.
were born outside Qatar.

Key

List of players

By country of birth

References

External links
 Qatar national football team at National-Football-Teams.com
 Qatar Football Association (QFA)
 Qatar national team at Soccerway

born outside
born outside
Association football player non-biographical articles
Qatar